Established in 2013, Village Media is a growing network of local news websites, providing breaking news, weather updates, entertainment, sports and business features, obituaries and more in the communities it serves.

Village Media’s network includes over 60 owned and operated and partner sites, all operating on its custom-built content management system developed in-house.

The company also provides technology, consulting and fulfillment services to strategic news media partners.

Village Media’s headquarters is based in Sault Ste. Marie, Ontario, where it launched its flagship site, SooToday.com, in 2002.

History
SooToday.com was originally launched in 2002 as a shopping and business directory. 

Following significant news cutbacks at MCTV that merged all of the region's local television newscasts into a single regional program produced in Sudbury, SooToday began producing locally-focused news content. In doing so, they became one of the first prominent Canadian ventures in hyper-local web-only media.

The company's expansion efforts have concentrated on mid-sized cities in Ontario, typically launching soon after the closure of the community's prior daily newspaper. 

In early 2021, the company expanded into the United States for the first time, with the acquisition of The Longmont Leader in Longmont, Colorado.

Assets owned by Village Media
For a full list of its owned and operated sites, visit the Village Media website.

References

External links
 

Mass media in Sault Ste. Marie, Ontario
Internet properties established in 2000
Canadian news websites
2000 establishments in Ontario
Internet radio in Canada
Newspaper companies of Canada
Companies based in Sault Ste. Marie, Ontario